Willians Bartolomeu dos Santos, known as Willians (born 20 April 1973) is a retired Brazilian football striker.

Club career
He arrived to Serbia in summer 1998 along his compatriot Adilson dos Santos and Fumaça, and signed with Red Star Belgrade. He played with Presidense in Brazil.  He made 7 appearances and scored twice in the 1998–99 First League of FR Yugoslavia.

He left Red Star in December and joined Greek club Proodeftiki F.C. He made 3 appearances in the 1998–99 Alpha Ethniki

Later, between 2006 and 2010, he played in Vietnam, with Hòa Phát Hà Nội, Khatoco Khánh Hòa, XSKT Cần Thơ and Hải Phòng.

Honors
Red Star Belgrade
FR Yugoslavia Cup: 1999

References

1973 births
Living people
Brazilian footballers
Brazilian expatriate footballers
Association football forwards
Red Star Belgrade footballers
First League of Serbia and Montenegro players
Expatriate footballers in Serbia and Montenegro
Proodeftiki F.C. players
Super League Greece players
Expatriate footballers in Greece
Hòa Phát Hà Nội FC players
Khatoco Khánh Hòa FC players
Can Tho FC players
Haiphong FC players
V.League 1 players
Expatriate footballers in Vietnam
Association football midfielders
Sportspeople from Sergipe